"Nulla accade" (Nothing happens) is the first single released by the Italian rappers, Guè Pequeno and Marracash, from the studio album Santeria, released in 2016. That year, the song went double platinum in Italy.

Charts

References 

2016 singles
Universal Records singles
2016 songs